This is a list of Women's National Basketball Association players by total career regular season three-point field goals made. Active players are in bold.

Statistics accurate as of the conclusion of the 2020 WNBA season

External links
WNBA Year-by-Year Leaders and Records for 3-pointers | Basketball-Reference.com

Lists of Women's National Basketball Association players
Women's National Basketball Association statistics